John J. Dillon (November 7, 1856 – March 1, 1950) was the editor and publisher of the Rural New Yorker. He was the first commissioner of the New York State Department of Foods and Markets in 1914.

Biography
He was born on November 7, 1856, in White Lake, New York, to Mary Welsh and John Dillon. He attended Liberty Institute (New York) and Albany College (New York) He taught school in Sullivan County, New York in 1874. He worked as an editor at the Orange County Farmer in Port Jervis, New York. He went to work for the Rural New Yorker in 1890 as the advertising manager.

He married Mary C. May. He was appointed as the Commissioner of the New York State Department of Foods and Markets in 1914. While commissioner, he was responsible for one of the largest milk strikes in state history in 1916.

He died on March 1, 1950, at his apartment at the Plaza Hotel in Manhattan, New York City. He was buried in Gate of Heaven Cemetery.

Publications
Hind Sights (1911)
Organized Co-Operation (1923)

See also
 Agriculture in New York

References

1856 births
1950 deaths